The General Military Council for Iraqi Revolutionaries ( al-Majlis al-‘Askari al-‘Āmm li-Thuwwār al-‘Irāq) abbreviated as GMCIR or MCIR, is a Ba'athist militant group active in Iraq headed by Saddam Hussein-era military and political leaders. It has been described by Al Jazeera as "one of the main groups" in the Iraqi insurgency.

The Council began its insurgency against the Iraqi government in January 2014 as a unifying command for the former Sunni Arab Spring protesters that Nouri al-Maliki's government had cracked down upon since 2012. The figures associated with the MCIR have stated that it has a central command and "the footprints of a professional army", that it follows the Geneva Convention protocol rules, as well as claiming to be non-sectarian and seeking a "democratic solution" to the Iraqi crisis. The MCIR has announced its opposition to Iranian influence in Iraq and the role the IRGC have played with Iraqi security forces.

The Carnegie Endowment for International Peace characterized the MCIR as an Arab Socialist Ba'ath Party – Iraq Region front group.

By the end of 2014 the group was eclipsed by ISIL and had become defunct.

Presence in Iraq

The MCIR has a presence in Al Anbar Governorate (especially Ramadi and Fallujah), Saladin, Baghdad, Abu Ghraib, Mosul, and Diyala. After seizing and capturing Mosul, the MCIR entered it along with many opposition armed forces, including ISIL. They installed a former officer in the Iraqi Army, Major General Azhar al-Ubaidi, with the approval of the other forces that entered Mosul, as governor. A municipal worker described MCIR as administering the management of the city better than the Iraqi government, which was "providing electricity for only 2 or 3 hours a day," and was "corrupt."

After the Iraqi Parliament approved the government of the new PM Haider al-Abadi on 8 September 2014, the MCIR stated on 9 September "Our people are being deceived, misled, ignored and mocked, while the political process stayed on the same faces." They commented in the statement on the installation of Nouri al-Maliki as a vice-president of Fuad Masum, saying "Instead of prosecuting al-Maliki for his crimes and his explosive barrels that are being thrown on the heads of innocent people, the political leaders of Iraq honored him by making him vice-president of the republic of murder and destruction."

Relationships with other groups

Association of Muslim Scholars
The GMIR has close links with the Association of Muslim Scholars, a group that considers the current Iraqi government as illegitimate due to being the result of the United States occupation.

ISIL
The MCIR's relationship with the Islamic State in Iraq and the Levant is one of cooperation, yet there are significant differences between the two. Despite taking part in the same June 2014 offensive, which wrested control of much of Northern Iraq from Baghdad, MCIR spokesman and former General Muzhir al Qaisi has criticized ISIL and their strict implementation of Shari'a law, describing members of ISIL as "barbarians." He also claimed that the MCIR was stronger than ISIL.

An unnamed source for the MCIR stated: "We plan to avoid them [ISIS] until we are settled and operations are finished; then we will kick them out."

The presence of MCIR fighters on the ground has been noted by observers, who argued that United States airstrikes would "inflame" the situation in Iraq by not taking into account the diversity of the opposition to the al-Maliki regime.

Kurdish Region
The MCIR reportedly has a truce agreement with the Kurdistan Region not to target Kurdish territory, in return for the Regional Government's non-interference in the Council creating an autonomous area outside of the control of the current Iraqi government.

Media
Iraqi TV coverage of early 2014 events within the country was split along sectarian, religious lines. Channels loyal to Prime Minister Nouri Maliki, including the government's own al-Iraqiya TV, are rallying Iraqis to volunteer and fight to restore order and remove "terrorists". Meanwhile, Sunni channels present the latest advances by the insurgents as part of an uprising against what they call "al-Maliki's army."

According to western media, Al-Rafidain TV is particularly supportive of the cause of the "revolutionaries" and "mujahideen" who it says are fighting to liberate the country.

See also
 List of armed groups in the Iraqi Civil War

References

External links
  
  

2014 establishments in Iraq
Arab nationalism in Iraq
Arab nationalist militant groups
Arab socialist organizations
Ba'athist organizations
War in Iraq (2013–2017)
Iraqi insurgency (2003–2011)
Iraqi nationalism
Organizations associated with the Ba'ath Party
Rebel groups in Iraq
Socialism in Iraq
Anti-ISIL factions in Iraq